Bakkerud is a surname. Notable people with the surname include:

 Andreas Bakkerud (born 1991), Norwegian rallycross driver
 Christian Bakkerud (1984–2011), Danish race car driver
 Ingvild Bakkerud (born 1995), Norwegian handball player
 Odd Bakkerud (1931–1989), Norwegian fiddle player